Yaghoub Ali Shourvarzi (4 May 1924 – 1999) was an Iranian heavyweight freestyle wrestler. He placed sixth at the 1959 World Wrestling Championships and tenth at the 1960 Summer Olympics.

References

1924 births
1999 deaths
People from Nishapur
Olympic wrestlers of Iran
Wrestlers at the 1960 Summer Olympics
Iranian male sport wrestlers
20th-century Iranian people